Fiamma Benítez Iannuzzi (born 19 June 2004), simply known as Fiamma, is a Spanish professional footballer who plays as a forward for Liga F club Valencia CF and the Spain women's national team.

Early life
Fiamma was born in Dénia to Argentine parents.

Club career
Fiamma has played for Levante in Spain. She appeared in the professional 2021–22 Primera División for them.

International career
Fiamma is eligible to play for Spain or Argentina. Representing the former, she won the 2022 UEFA Women's Under-19 Championship and the 2022 FIFA U-20 Women's World Cup, and made her senior debut on 11 November 2022, being a 56th-minute substitution in a 7–0 friendly home win over Argentina, ironically, for which she had shown interest in the past.

International goals

References

External links

2004 births
Living people
People from Marina Alta
Sportspeople from the Province of Alicante
Footballers from the Valencian Community
Spanish women's footballers
Women's association football forwards
Levante UD Femenino players
Primera División (women) players
Spain women's youth international footballers
Spain women's international footballers
Spanish people of Argentine descent
Sportspeople of Argentine descent